Khentrul Jamphel Lodrö Rinpoché (Tibetan: ཤར་མཁན་སྤྲུལ་འཇམ་དཔལ་བློ་གྲོས།, Wylie: shar mkhan sprul 'jam dpal blo gros) (born 1968) is a Tibetan Buddhist Rimé Master.  Shar Khentrul Jamphel Lodro Rinpoché teaches predominantly the extensive Kalachakra system according to the Jonang tradition of Tibetan Buddhism.  He is the founder and spiritual director of the Tibetan Buddhist Rimé Institute or Tong Zuk Dechen Ling in the Tibetan language. He translated the Jonang Kalachakra practice texts, with instructions, into English and Chinese.

Background 
Khentrul Rinpoché Jamphel Lodro was born in the Golok Region of Eastern Tibet. Nowadays, he is based in Australia, where the Rimé Institute is also located. Khentrul Rinpoché travels all over the world to teach  Kalachakra. Furthermore, he founded Dzokden, an international community for Kalachakra practitioners that advocates for world peace from a Jonang perspective and Kalachakra in particular.   He was recognized as the reincarnation of the great Kalachakra Yogi Ngawang Chözin Gyatso.  In 2017, Khentrul Rinpoché unveiled a completely accurate statue of the 24 Armed Kalachakra deity to help generate the causes for world peace.

Rimé Master 

Even though Khentrul Rinpoché is part of the Jonang school, he has trained with more than 25 teachers from all major Tibetan Buddhist traditions.  Through this path, he earned the title of Rimé Master in 1997, a title which was officially recognized by the Dalai Lama in 2013. He styles himself as non-sectarian (meaning he does not differentiate between different sects) and is thus part of the Tibetan  Rimé movement . At the core of his teachings is the recognition that there is great value in the diversity of traditions found in this world.  However, his work is mostly based within a Tibetan Buddhist context.

Books

See also 
Rimé movement
Kalachakra
Jonang

References

External links 

 Official Site of Khentrul Rinpoche
 Dzokden Foundation, the International Foundation & Community of Khentrul Rinpoche
 Khentrul Rinpoche's centre in Australia
 Khentrul Rinpoche's Kalachakra groups in the USA

Jonang lamas
Rimé lamas
Tulkus
Rinpoches
Living people
1968 births